Vicente Seguí Porres, better known simply as Vicente, is a Spanish singer born in Vilamarxant (Valencia, Spain) on 25 December 1978. He started with the Valencian orchestra "La Metro". He took part and won the title in the third series of Operación Triunfo in 2003.

He later released three albums and did many concerts. He also collaborated in musical programs on Valencian TV including Bona Nit and El Picú as copresenter and singer.

Discography
Confidencias (released on Universal – Vale Music on 20 April 2004 produced by Alejandro Abad)
Gardel Mediterráneo (released on Warner Music on 12 September 2006, produced by Nacho Mañó)
Mirándote lanzado (released 20 July 2009) produced by Jose Manuel Domenech

References

External links 
 Official Website
 YouTube Official page

1978 births
Living people
People from Valencia
Spanish pop singers
Star Academy participants
Star Academy winners
Singers from the Valencian Community
Operación Triunfo contestants
21st-century Spanish singers
21st-century Spanish male singers